Sesommata is a genus of moths in the family Palaephatidae.

Species
 Sesommata leuroptera Davis, 1986
 Sesommata trachyptera Davis, 1986
 Sesommata holocapna (Meyrick, 1931)
 Sesommata paraplatysaris Davis, 1986
 Sesommata platysaris (Meyrick, 1931)
 Sesommata albimaculata Davis, 1986

References

Palaephatidae
Monotrysia genera